The 2018–19 Eastern Washington Eagles men's basketball team represented Eastern Washington University during the 2018–19 NCAA Division I men's basketball season. The Eagles were led by second-year head coach Shantay Legans and played their home games at Reese Court in Cheney, Washington as members of the Big Sky Conference. They finished the season 16–18, 12–8 in Big Sky play to finish in third place. They defeated Montana State and Southern Utah to advance to the championship game of the Big Sky tournament where they lost to Montana.

Previous season
The Eagles finished the 2017–18 season 20–15, 13–5 in Big Sky play to finish in a tie for third place. At the Big Sky tournament they defeated  Portland State and Southern Utah to advance to the championship game where they lost to Montana. They were invited to the College Basketball Invitational where they lost in the first round to Utah Valley.

Offseason

Departures

Incoming transfers

2018 recruiting class

2019 recruiting class

Roster

Schedule and results

|-
!colspan=9 style=|Non-conference regular season

|-
!colspan=9 style=| Big Sky regular season

|-
!colspan=9 style=| Big Sky tournament

Source

See also
 2018–19 Eastern Washington Eagles women's basketball team

References

Eastern Washington Eagles men's basketball seasons
Eastern Washington
Eastern Washington
Eastern Washington